Ousegate is a street in the city centre of York, in England.  It is divided into High Ousegate and Low Ousegate.

The street forms part of the city's central shopping area.  High Ousegate is pedestrianised, but Low Ousegate is a key transport route, busy with bus services.

History
The area covered by the street lay outside the walls of Roman Eboracum, although archaeological evidence has been found of a bathhouse on the corner of Spurriergate, and temples to Hercules and the Emperor on the corner of Nessgate.  Items associated with Viking Jorvik have also been found, but at this time, the area appears to have been a large open space.  However, with the construction of the Ouse Bridge, Ousegate emerged as the route east from it.  The street was first recorded in the 1120s, by which time the area appears to have become built up with houses, including at least one built of stone, and the churches of All Saints, Pavement and St Michael, Spurriergate.  By the 14th-century, the street was known for its lorimers (makers and sellers of metalwork for bridles and other horse furniture) and spurriers.

In 1694, a major fire destroyed thirty houses on the street, and as a result, other than the churches, there are no remaining pre-1700 building on the street.  Low Ousegate was very narrow until 1734, when its junction with Spurriergate was widened, while in 1769, the south-east side of the street was rebuilt further back, and in the 1810s, when Ouse Bridge was reconstructed, the part of the street near the bridge were raised, all the houses on the north-west side were demolished and rebuilt, along with some on the south-east side.

In the Mediaeval period, the market on Pavement often overflowed into High Ousegate, while from 1727, a herb market was held on the street.  A corn exchange was built on the south side of the street in 1926, but closed in 1946.   Low Ousegate was the original location of the Yorkshire Philosophical Society.

Layout and architecture

Low Ousegate runs north-east from Ouse Bridge, to its junction with Spurriergate and Nessgate.  The snickelway Church Lane leads off its north-west side, while steps down to King's Staith lead off the south-east side.  All the buildings from 4 to 14 Low Ousegate date from the rebuilding in the 1810s, and their design may have been loosely based on drawings by Peter Atkinson.  These are followed by St Michael's Church.  On the south-east side, numbers 1 to 7 were also rebuilt in the 1810s, although number 7 retains some 17th-century material, including panelling.  Number 11 has 17th-century origins, while 13 was built in the early 18th-century.

The line of the street continues as High Ousegate, which runs up to its junction with Coppergate, Parliament Street, Pavement and Piccadilly.  Several snickelways lead off its north-west side, including Popes Head Alley, while a path on its south-east side leads to Coppergate.  Notable buildings on the north-west side include 5 High Ousegate, built in 1743, and 11 to 15, all dating from the early-18th century rebuilding.  On the south-east side, other than All Saints Church, notable buildings include 19, 20 and 21, all likely to be early-18th century, and 23-24 High Ousegate, a four-storey building dating from 1850.

References

Streets in York